Eyvanki, also Romanized as Eyvane Kay, Eyvānkī, Aivaneki, Aivan-e Ki, and Eyvānakī; also known as Aivān-i-Kaif, is a city in and capital of Eyvanki District, Garmsar County, Semnan Province, Iran. At the 2006 census, its population was 14,462, in 2,760 families. People of Eyvanki are Tat and they speak the Tati language.

See also

 Charax, Rhagiana

References

Populated places in Garmsar County
Cities in Semnan Province